Cedar bark textile was used by indigenous people in the Pacific Northwest region of modern-day Canada and the United States. Historically, most items of clothing were made of shredded and woven cedar bark. 

The names of the trees which provide the bark material  are Thuja plicata, the Western redcedar and Callitropsis nootkatensis, or yellow cypress (often called "yellow cedar"). Bark was peeled in long strips from the trees, the outer layer was split away, and the flexible inner layer was shredded and processed.  The resulting felted strips of bark were soft and could be plaited, sewn or woven into a variety of fabrics that were either dense and watertight, or soft and comfortable.  

Women wore skirts and capes of red cedar bark, while men wore long capes of cedar bark into which some mountain goat wool was woven for decorative effect.

See also
Barkcloth
Northwest Coast art
Textile arts of indigenous peoples of the Americas

References

External links

Northwest Coast art
Indigenous textile art of the Americas
Nonwoven fabrics
Woven fabrics